is an underground metro station located in the city of Higashiōsaka,  Osaka Prefecture, Japan, operated by the Osaka Metro.  It is directly underneath but not connected with the JR West Takaida-Chūō Station. There are no direct transfers between the two stations. Passengers transferring between the two stations must transfer at street level.

Lines
Takaida Station is served by the Chūō Line, and is located 16.1 kilometers from the terminus of the line at Cosmosquare Station.

Station layout
The station has one underground  island platform, capable of accommodating eight-car trains. The station is staffed.

Platforms

History 
The station was opened on  April 5, 1985.

Passenger statistics
In fiscal 2019, the station was used by an average of 17,726 passengers daily.

Surrounding area
Nagase River
Higashi Osaka University

See also
 List of railway stations in Japan

References

External links

Official home page 

Osaka Metro stations
Railway stations in Japan opened in 1985
Higashiōsaka